Wanted by the Police is a 1938 American crime film directed by Howard Bretherton and written by Wellyn Totman. The film stars Frankie Darro, Evalyn Knapp, Robert Kent, Matty Fain, Lillian Elliott and Don Rowan. The film was released on September 21, 1938, by Monogram Pictures.

Plot

Cast          
Frankie Darro as Danny Murphy
Evalyn Knapp as Kathleen Murphy
Robert Kent as Mike O'Leary
Matty Fain as Williams
Lillian Elliott as Mrs. Murphy
Don Rowan as Owens
Sam Bernard as Stringer
Mauritz Hugo as Marty
Walter Merrill as Trigger
Ralph Peters as Jess
Thelma White as Lillian
Willy Castello as Russo

References

External links
 

1938 films
American crime films
1938 crime films
Monogram Pictures films
Films directed by Howard Bretherton
American black-and-white films
1930s English-language films
1930s American films